Eftychia (Efi) Achtsioglou (Giannitsa, 4 January 1985), is a Greek professor of Labour law, lawyer, politician, and current SYRIZA MP from 2019.

She served as the Minister for Labour, Social Insurance and Social Solidarity from 5 November 2016 to 9 July 2019.

Early life and education
She was born in 1985, in Giannitsa. She completed her studies with the grade of Excellent in the AUTH Law School and in 2009 she acquired -again with the grade of Excellent- her postgraduate degree in civil law and political science from the same school.

She worked as part of a researching scholarship in the Centre of International and European Economic Law (CIEEL), while in 2014, she completed as part of a scholarship in the State Scholarship Foundation her studies in labour law, under the supervision of professor Aris Kazakos.

Personal life
In 2019, during the election campaign, she revealed that she was in a relationship with then Minister of State Dimitris Tzanakopoulos and in January 2021, stated that she is 5 months expecting.

Occupation
She is a Thessaloniki lawyer, and was a science partner of the SYRIZA EP group in Brussels from July 2014.

She also worked in the European Parliament, alongside the Department of civil law, political procedure and labour law of the law school of the Aristotle University from 2009 till 2013, and as a researcher in the Centre of International and European Economic Law (CIEEL).

Political career
She was a candidate for the national ballot of SYRIZA in both the January and the September elections. Within SYRIZA she navigated party organs, as a member of the central committee, and a member of the A’ Thessaloniki committee.

As the executive of the political office of the ministry of labour, she was responsible for the negotiations of the Greek government with the institutions on issues regarding the job market and social security. She has served as a member of the executive council of OAED and a member of ASE.

Governmental Positions (2016-2019)
From 5 of November 2016 to 9 July 2019, she was the Minister for Labour, Social Insurance and Social Solidarity in the Tsipras II cabinet. During her tenure she was linked with the expansion of collective bargainings, the raise of the minimum wage by 11% and by 27% for young people (650 Euros), the abolishment of sub-minimum wage, the lowering of unemployment and of unregistered employment, the creation of OPEKA, the new procedures for adoption, etc.

Greek MP (2019-)
In the 2019 election, she was placed in the second place of the national ballot list of SYRIZA and elected to the Hellenic Parliament.

Works
Monographies:
Ε. Αχτσιόγλου, Ι. Κουμασίδης και Σ. Μίτας. (2012). ‘Ξαναπιάνοντας το νήμα...για τη σχέση δημοκρατίας και σοσιαλισμού’, εκδ. Θύραθεν.
E. Achtsioglou, (2010). Sustainable Development and Its Judicial Review in Greek Case Law: A conceptual and methodological analysis. LAP Lambert Academic Publishing.

Articles and chapters in collective works:
E. Achtsioglou / M. Doherty (2014). There Must Be Some Way Out of Here...The Crisis, Labour Rights and Member States in the Eye of the Storm, European Law Journal, 20: 219 – 240.
Ε. Αχτσιόγλου (2014). Η απόσπαση εργαζομένων κατά την παροχή υπηρεσιών στην ενωσιακή έννομη τάξη: Χαρακτηριστικό πεδίο έντασης μεταξύ των εθνικών συστημάτων εργατικoύ δικαίου και των κανόνων της ενιαίας αγοράς, σε Α. Καζάκου και Α. Στεργίου (επιμ.), Το «Νέο» Εργατικό Δίκαιο, Τιμητικός Τόμος Ιωάννη Κουκιάδη, εκδ. Σάκκουλα: 185–209.
Ε. Αχτσιόγλου (2013). Δημόσιο συμφέρον και συλλογική αυτονομία: Η υποχρέωση επαγρύπνησης του δικαστή της συνταγματικότητας, ΕΕργΔ 2013, 1: 1–13. 
E. Achtsioglou (2013). Greece 2010–2012: labour in the maelstrom of deregulation, Transfer: European Review of Labour and Research, 19: 125–127.
Γ. Κατρούγκαλος / Ε. Αχτσιόγλου (2012). «Μνημονιακές» πολιτικές και Εργατικό Δίκαιο, Ειδικό τεύχος στη μνήμη του Α. Καρδαρά, 17: 1333–1358.
E. Achtsioglou / M. Rocca (2012). Trade unions, collective bargaining and collective action beyond the EU and its Court of Justice: A tale of shrinking immunities and sparkling new competences from the land of the Lesser Depression, Atelier de Droit Social (AdDS) Working Papers, 1: 1- 39. 
E. Achtsioglou (2011). The judicial treatment of the conflicts between trade union rights and economic freedoms in EU legal order: a critical analysis of the ECJ rulings in Laval and Viking cases, σε: Th. SAKELLAROPOULOS / A. STERGIOU (επιμ.), Posted workers in Europe: The cases of Greece and Bulgaria, Scientific Society for Social Cohesion and Development Press, Athens, 63–104.

References 

1985 births
Aristotle University of Thessaloniki alumni
Government ministers of Greece
Labour ministers of Greece
Greek government-debt crisis
Living people
Syriza politicians
Greek MPs 2019–2023
People from Giannitsa